Gerard "Gerry" Gray (born 20 January 1961) is a former soccer player. Born in Scotland, he represented and coached the Canadian national soccer team.

Club career
Born and raised in Scotland, Gray moved to Toronto, Ontario with his family at the age of 12 and played for several teams in Canada and the United States in the NASL. In 1982 Gray was named to the NASL's first North American All-Star team.

Gray also played indoor soccer in the original MISL for the Chicago Sting as well as the Tacoma Stars.

Gray played outdoors again in the Canadian Soccer League with the Ottawa Intrepid in 1988, Hamilton Steelers in 1989, Toronto Blizzard in 1990, the Steelers again in 1991, and then the Blizzard again in the same year.

In April 2001, Gray was inducted into the Canadian Soccer Hall of Fame.

International career
Gray was a member of the national youth team that played in the 1979 FIFA World Youth Championship in Japan. He made his senior debut on 15 September 1980 for Canada in a 4–0 victory against New Zealand in a friendly match in Vancouver. Gray earned a total of 35 caps, scoring 2 goals, one of which came via a stunning free kick versus Mexico in a 1982 World Cup qualifier in Mexico City.

He represented Canada in 11 FIFA World Cup qualification matches and played in two of Canada's games at the 1986 FIFA World Cup finals, the country's only appearance at a World Cup finals. He also played for Canada at the 1984 Olympics.

His final appearance came in a 0–2 defeat in a March 1991 North American Nations Cup match against the United States in Torrance, California.

He was named Mississauga's Professional Athlete of the Year in 1980, and he was inducted into the Mississauga Sports Hall of Fame in 1995.

Managerial career
On 8 April 2010, Gray was appointed the head coach for the Tacoma F.C. of the USL Premier Development League.

International goals
Scores and results list Canada's goal tally first.

References

External links
 / Canada Soccer Hall of Fame
 
 NASL/MISL stats

1961 births
Living people
People from Possilpark
Footballers from Glasgow
Soccer players from Mississauga
Scottish emigrants to Canada
Naturalized citizens of Canada
Association football midfielders
Canadian soccer coaches
Canadian soccer players
Canada men's international soccer players
Canadian expatriate soccer players
Canadian expatriate sportspeople in the United States
Canada Soccer Hall of Fame inductees
Canadian Soccer League (1987–1992) players
Chicago Sting (NASL) players
Chicago Sting (MISL) players
Kansas City Comets (original MISL) players
1986 FIFA World Cup players
Olympic soccer players of Canada
Footballers at the 1984 Summer Olympics
Hamilton Steelers (1981–1992) players
Major Indoor Soccer League (1978–1992) players
Montreal Manic players
North American Soccer League (1968–1984) indoor players
New York Cosmos players
North American Soccer League (1968–1984) players
Ottawa Intrepid players
St. Louis Steamers (original MISL) players
Tacoma Stars players
Toronto Blizzard (1986–1993) players
Vancouver Whitecaps (1974–1984) players
Expatriate soccer players in the United States
Canada men's youth international soccer players